The 2004 AFC Champions League was the 23rd edition of the top-level Asian club football tournament and the 2nd edition under the current AFC Champions League title. The title was won by Al-Ittihad over Seongnam Ilhwa Chunma.

Format
Group Stage
A total of 28 clubs were divided into 7 groups of four, based on region i.e. East Asian and Southeast Asian clubs were drawn in groups E to G, while the rest were grouped in groups A to D.  Each club played double round-robin (home and away) against fellow three group members, a total of 6 matches each.  Clubs received 3pts for a win, 1pt for a tie, 0pts for a loss.  The clubs were ranked according to points and tie breakers were in the following order:
 Points earned between the clubs in question
 Goal Differential between the clubs in question
 Goals For between the clubs in question
 Points earned within the group
 Goal Differential within the group
 Goals For within the group

The seven group winners along with the defending champion advanced to the quarter-finals.

Knockout Round
All 8 clubs were randomly matched; however, the only restriction was that the clubs from the same country could not face each other in the quarter-finals.  The games were conducted in 2 legs, home and away, and the aggregate score decided the match winner.  If the aggregate score couldn't produce a winner, "away goals rule" was used.  If still tied, clubs played extra time, where "away goals rule" still applied.  If still tied, the game went to penalties.

Group stage

Group A

Group B

Group C

Group D

Group E

Group F

Group G

Knock-out stage

Bracket

Quarter-finals
First-leg home team shown first.
First-leg home team score shown first for both legs.

First leg

Second leg

Jeonbuk Hyundai Motors won 5–1 on aggregate.

Al-Ittihad won 2–1 on aggregate.

Pakhtakor won 5–1 on aggregate.

Seongnam Ilhwa Chunma won 11–2 on aggregate.

Semifinals
First-leg home team shown first. First-leg home team score shown first for both legs.

First leg

Second leg

Al-Ittihad won 4–3 on aggregate.

Seongnam Ilhwa Chunma won 2–0 on aggregate.

Final
First-leg home team shown first. First-leg home team score shown first for both legs.

First leg

Second leg

Al-Ittihad won 6–3 on aggregate.

References

External links
 AFC Champions League 2004 Official Page (English)
 AFC Champions League 2004 at RSSSF.com

1
2004